Umar Khan Jamali is a Pakistani politician who is member-elect of the Provincial Assembly of the Balochistan.

On 8 October 2018, he was inducted into the provincial Balochistan cabinet of Chief Minister Jam Kamal Khan.

References

Living people
Pakistan Tehreek-e-Insaf MPAs (Balochistan)
Year of birth missing (living people)
Provincial ministers of Balochistan